Gaijin: Roads to Freedom (Portuguese: Gaijin – Caminhos da Liberdade), also known as Gaijin, a Brazilian Odyssey, is a 1980 Brazilian drama film, the debut film of director Tizuka Yamasaki.

The film is based on real events in the history of Japanese immigrants who came to Brazil in search of better opportunities. Its sequel, Gaijin 2: Love Me As I Am, was released on September 2, 2005.

Plot
Japan, 1908. Motivated by poverty in the country and few job prospects, many Japanese have emigrated in search of opportunities. As the emigration company only accepted family groups who had at least a couple, Yamada (Jiro Kawarazaki) and Kobayashi (Keniti Kaneko) who were brothers, see as solution that Yamada would marry Titoe (Kyoko Tsukamoto), who was only 16 years old. Yamada and Titoe had just met and, along with a cousin, they depart to Brazil. After 52 days of travel they finally arrive in Brazil where they will work in Santa Rosa farm, in São Paulo, where the coffee expansion was intense. But they stumble upon a foreman who handles settlers with hostility, demanding them to work to exhaustion. In addition their wages are stolen by the owners of the farm, only being treated with respect by other settlers and by Tonho (Antônio Fagundes), the accountant of the farm.

Cast
Kyoko Tsukamoto as Titoe
Antônio Fagundes as Tonho
Jiro Kawarazaki as Yamada
Keniti Kaneko as Kobayashi
Gianfrancesco Guarnieri as Enrico
Álvaro Freire as Chico Santos
Louise Cardoso as Angelina
José Dumont as Ceará
Yuriko Oguri as Mrs. Nakano
Clarisse Abujamra as Felícia
Carlos Augusto Strazzer as Dr. Heitor
Dorothy Leirner as Grazziela
Maiku Kozonoi as Keniti Nakano

References

External links
 

1980s historical drama films
Brazilian historical drama films
Films about immigration
Films directed by Tizuka Yamasaki
Films set in 1908
1980s Japanese-language films
1980s Portuguese-language films
1980 drama films
1980 films